The men's 3 metre springboard competition at 2013 World Aquatics Championships was held on July 25 with the preliminary round and semifinal and the final on July 26.

Results
The preliminary round was held on July 25 at 10:00 and the semifinal at 14:00 with the final on July 26 at 17:30.

Green denotes finalists

Blue denotes semifinalists

References

Men's 3 m springboard